The chapters of the manga series Tokyo Mew Mew were written by Reiko Yoshida and illustrated by Mia Ikumi. The first chapter premiered in the September 2000 issue of Nakayoshi, where it was serialized monthly until its conclusion in the February 2003 issue. The series focuses on five girls infused with the DNA of rare animals that gives them special powers and allows them to transform into "Mew Mews". Led by Ichigo Momomiya, the girls protect the earth from aliens who wish to "reclaim" it. A sequel, Tokyo Mew Mew a la Mode written and illustrated solely by Mia Ikumi, was serialized in Nakayoshi from April 2003 to February 2004. The sequel introduces a new Mew Mew, Berry Shirayuki, who becomes the temporary leader of the Mew Mews while they face a new threat in the form of the Saint Rose Crusaders.

The 27 unnamed chapters were collected and published in seven tankōbon volumes by Kodansha starting on February 1, 2001; the last volume was released on April 4, 2003. The 11 chapters of Tokyo Mew Mew a la Mode were published in two tankōbon volumes on November 6, 2003 and April 6, 2004. Tokyo Mew Mew was adapted into a 52-episode anime series by Studio Pierrot that aired in Japan on TV Aichi and TV Tokyo from April 6, 2002 to March 29, 2003. The manga series is licensed for regional language releases by Pika Édition in France, Japonica Polonica Fantastica in Poland, in Finnish by Sangatsu Manga, and Carlsen Comics in Germany, Denmark, and Sweden.

Tokyo Mew Mew was licensed for an English-language release in North America by Tokyopop. It released the first volume of Tokyo Mew Mew on April 8, 2003 and released new volumes monthly until the final volume was released on May 11, 2004. The company also licensed Tokyo Mew Mew a la Mode, publishing the first volume on June 7, 2005 and the second on December 8, 2006. In the original Japanese releases the chapters are unnamed, while Tokyopop added chapter names to their English release, sometimes combining numbered chapters under a single name. Tokyo Mew Mew and its sequel are among the first manga series Public Square Books chose to release in Spanish in North America. Tokyo Mew Mew was also released in English in Singapore by Chuang Yi.

Volume list

Tokyo Mew Mew

Tokyo Mew Mew a la Mode

Notes

See also
List of Tokyo Mew Mew characters
List of Tokyo Mew Mew episodes

References

External links
 Official Chuang Yi Tokyo Mew Mew website
 
 

Tokyo Mew Mew